George Hayter Chubb, 1st Baron Hayter (29 August 1848 – 7 November 1946), known as Sir George Chubb, 1st Baronet, from 1900 to 1927, was a British businessman.

Chubb was the son of John Chubb (d. 1872), and the grandson of Charles Chubb (1772–1845), who had founded Chubb and Sons Lock and Safe Co. He was a director of the family firm along with his brothers John and Harry and its Managing Director from 1882 until his death. For a time, he was also chairman of the company. 

Chubb was knighted in 1885 and created a Baronet, of Newlands, in 1900. In 1927 he was further honoured when he was raised to the peerage as Baron Hayter, of Chislehurst in the County of Kent. George Chubb's middle name Hayter, (his grandmother's maiden name) was used for the Barony since at the time it was considered unacceptable for company names (albeit a family company) to be used in the House of Lords.

Personal life
In 1870, Chubb married Sarah Vanner Early, only daughter of Charles Early, J.P., of Witney, Oxon. She died in 1940. The couple had three daughters and two sons.

Death
Hayter survived her by six years and died in November 1946, aged 98. He was succeeded in his titles by his elder son, Charles.

Arms

References

Sources
 Kidd, Charles, Williamson, David (editors). Debrett's Peerage and Baronetage (1990 edition). New York: St Martin's Press, 1990, 
 

1848 births
1946 deaths
Barons in the Peerage of the United Kingdom
Barons created by George V
Knights Bachelor
English knights